The Big Ore is a 1964 drama film directed by Vasily Ordynsky and based on the novel by Georgi Vladimov.

Plot 
Viktor Pronin (Yevgeni Urbansky) returned from the army to the bride (Svetlana Zhgun), and she – the other. Then Victor went to   great   Kursk ore, where the work is in full swing – all live in anticipation of the first car of ore. To check Pronyakin, Brigadier (Vsevolod Sanaev) gives him beaten MAZ: mend – a long time came. The guy got in the  hostel  to repair the car and began to put one after the other records. Victor had got no friends, embittered against him brigade, but the first bucket of ore carry exactly it.

Cast 
 Yevgeni Urbansky as Victor Pronyakin
 Mikhail Gluzsky  as experienced chauffeur
 Larisa Luzhina as Vera
 Stanislav Lyubshin as Antonov
 Inna Makarova as Tamara, wife Pronyakin
 Vsevolod Sanaev as Brigadier Matsuev
 Roman Homyatov as young driver
 Vladimir Troshin as driver
 Valentin Nikulin as Vladimir
 Georgiy Zhzhonov as surgeon
 Maya Kristalinskaya as song overs

See also
 The Communist (film)

References

External links 
  
  Encyclopedia of Russian cinema

1964 films
Soviet drama films
Mosfilm films
1964 drama films
Soviet black-and-white films
1960s Russian-language films